Tegrodera erosa is a species of blister beetle in the family Meloidae. It is found in Central America and North America.

Subspecies
These two subspecies belong to the species Tegrodera erosa:
 Tegrodera erosa erosa LeConte, 1851
 Tegrodera erosa inornata Blaisdell, 1918

References

Further reading

 
 

Meloidae
Articles created by Qbugbot
Beetles described in 1851